Simphiwe Mendy Dludlu (born 21 September 1987) is a South African soccer player who played as a defender for Mamelodi Sundowns and formerly for the South Africa women's national team. She is also the coach of the Tshwane University of Technology  women's High performance soccer team. Simphiwe has been the Head Coach of the South African U17 Women's National team since 2017. She has led the team to their second Youth FIFA World Cup in 2018 Uruguay.

Early life
Dludlu attended TuksSport High School. In 2007, she began studies at University of Pretoria and graduated with a sport science degree in 2012.

Playing career

Club
At a club level, Dludlu currently plays as a defender for Mamelodi Sundowns. In football circles, she is nicknamed "Shorty".

International
Dludlu made her first appearance for the South Africa senior national team in 2006 during a match against Mozambique. She was the team's captain from 2009 to 2010. She was the captain of the national team between 2009 and 2010.

In May 2014, Dludlu made her 50th cap for the South Africa senior team during a friendly match against Ghana. In September 2014, she was named to the roster in preparation for the 2014 African Women's Championship in Namibia. She announced her retirement from international football in March 2014, aspiring to pursue a career in coaching instead. She finished her playing career for the South African team on 63 caps.

Coaching career
Upon graduating from the University of Pretoria in 2012, she became coach of the university women's football team, playing in the University Sports South Africa (USSA) leagues. In her first two years with the team, they reached the final of the USSA Football National Club Championships. In May 2013, Dludlu earned a UEFA B Licence coaching certificate.

Alongside other former South African women's internationals, she is a scout for the Vodafone NXT Level programme.

Currently, Dludlu is coaching the South African U17 Women's team playing FIFA U17 Women's World Cup in Uruguay.

References

External links
 South Africa player profile

1987 births
Living people
People from Alexandra, Gauteng
Women's association football defenders
South African women's soccer players
South Africa women's international soccer players
Sportspeople from Gauteng